26th Division may refer to:

Infantry divisions
26th Division (German Empire)
26th Reserve Division (German Empire)
26th Infantry Division (Wehrmacht)
26th Waffen Grenadier Division of the SS (2nd Hungarian)
26th Indian Infantry Division 
26th Mountain Infantry Division Assietta (Italy)
26th Division (Imperial Japanese Army)
26th Infantry Division (Poland)
26th Division (Somalia)
26th Division (Spain)
26th Rifle Division (Soviet Union)
26th Division (United Kingdom)
26th Infantry Division (United States)

Armoured divisions
26th Panzer Division (Wehrmacht)

Artillery divisions
26th Flak Division (Wehrmacht)

Aviation divisions
26th Air Division (United States)